Christchurch Football Centre, is a multi-purpose stadium in the suburb of Russley in Christchurch, New Zealand.  It is used for football matches and is the home stadium of Southern League and National League side Christchurch United.

History
In 2014, Christchurch-based Russian businessman Slava Meyn announced he wanted to build a new football centre in Christchurch worth around $NZ8 million. Meyn bought 8 ha of land facing Yaldhurst Road in December 2012. He purchased a further 12 ha in May 2013. Between 2012 and 2013 he spent $3.5 million for the 20 hectares of land on Yaldhurst Road.

After gaining resource consent in late 2014, on 11 June 2015, Christchurch Football Centre was opened by then Prime Minister of New Zealand John Key, as the new home of Christchurch United.

Meyn plans to develop the 20-hectare site in Yaldhurst Road further, with a $40 million sports and education centre.

References

2015 establishments in New Zealand
Association football venues in New Zealand
Sports venues in Christchurch
Sports venues completed in 2015